Howard Theodore "Ted" Davis (1937–2009) was an American chemical engineer and Regents Professor in the Department of Chemical Engineering and Materials Science (CEMS) at the University of Minnesota. He is internationally known for his work in statistical thermodynamics, transport in porous media, and surface thermodynamics.  Davis was an author of more than 400 academic papers and five books including the acclaimed textbooks: “Linear Algebra and Linear Operators in Engineering” (Academic Press, 2000, 1st Edition).,  "Statistical Mechanics of Phases, Interfaces and Thin Films" (John Wiley & Sons, 1995, 1st Edition). He served as department head of CEMS for 15 years (1980-1995), followed by his leadership as dean (1995-2005) of the Institute of Technology, the University of Minnesota's college of physical science and engineering.  In 2008, Davis became the director of the University of Minnesota's BioTechnology Institute

Early life and education 
Davis grew up in western North Carolina in the small town of Hendersonville as the child of an apple farm and textile mill worker.  He received his B.S. in chemistry from Furman University in 1959 before completing his Ph.D. in chemistry at the University of Chicago in 1962   with advisor Stuart Rice on the topic of "Some theoretical and experimental studies of irreversible processes in simple dense fluids", part of which was later published as a book chapter.  He later completed a year of post-doctoral studies at the Free University of Brussels with Nobel laureate Ilya Prigogine before joining the faculty at the University of Minnesota in 1963.

Research and education at Minnesota 
Davis' background in chemistry led to new directions in chemical engineering research including fundamental questions in the fields of statistical mechanics, transport in porous media, and interfacial phenomena which had applications in fluid flow, industrial coating processes, recovery of oil, and nanotechnology.  His work was highlighted by physical insights that many attributed to his "amazing discipline" as a researcher.  He regularly described a research philosophy to pursue "the elegant solution" to problems, which built on his belief that the time saved by "quick and dirty" calculations could never compensate the for the lost intellectual opportunity.  His research was integral in moving chemical engineering away from traditional unit operations and towards more rigorous mathematical analysis.

Ted's contributions to education was broad with impact on undergraduate and graduate instruction in addition to faculty mentoring.  Ted's approach to graduate education pushed students to think as practitioners of fields beyond their specialty.  His lecture style was described as dense but clear, with a pace that quickened and slowed between mathematical description and verbal explanation.  His advising of graduate students was highly collaborative, with numerous students exploring topics with combined experiment in theory.  In all he advised more than 80 graduate students which led to the publication of more than 400 papers and two leading textbooks on the topics of linear algebra and statistical mechanics.

Tenure as dean 

In 1995, Ted Davis was named as dean of the Institute of Technology at the University of Minnesota, which was the university's college of engineering and physical sciences.  During his leadership he helped develop the Digital Technology Center.  He also was instrumental in created the University of Minnesota Department of Biomedical Engineering.  This was followed by the formation of degree programs in bio-based products engineering, computer engineering and biomedical engineering.  In addition, he established a professional master's program in software and infrastructure systems engineering.

During his time as Dean of IT, the college underwent several major renovations including the new Mechanical Engineering Building and the restoration of Walter library.  These additions expanded the capability of the college and provided locations for both the Science and Engineering Library as well as the Digital Technology center.  These capabilities expanded the opportunity of the information technology community of Minnesota, which was instrumental in numerous federally-funded research centers at the University of Minnesota. Davis stepped down after nine years in 2005 as the 3rd longest serving dean in the college's history.

In 2008, Ted enthusiastically accepted the role of Director of the BioTechnology Institute, the University of Minneosta's internal organization focusing on advanced research, training and interaction with industry in biological process technology; he held this position until May 2009.

Awards, honors, and legacy 
Ted's research and contributions to education and service have been highlighted with numerous awards, many of which identify his passion for scholarship, extensive curiosity, and generous and kind spirit.

In 1969 he was awarded a Guggenheim Fellowship.

In 1988, Ted was elected to the National Academy of Engineering (primary section Chemical, secondary section Materials).  His NAE election citation noted:

In 1997, the leadership of the University of Minnesota named Ted Regents Professor, the highest recognition of excellence at the university.  In 2008, the Minnesota Science and Technology Hall of Fame included him in its first class of inductees; this selection honors those Minnesotans that have had a lasting worldwide impact.

Ted leaves a broad and impactful legacy that expands beyond his research in chemical engineering and materials science. His decades of leadership as both department head and dean at the University of Minnesota led Professor Frank S. Bates to call him "our model of excellence."   Ted's research style of combined theory, simulation and experiment along with his focus on elegant mathematical solutions led to the renaissance in chemical engineering in the 1960s and 1970s that continued decades later. During his tenure as department head, the graduate chemical engineering program at the University of Minnesota consistently ranked as the top program by National Research Council. Ted has also led an exemplary career of expanding his research beyond his immediate field with broad interest in combining mathematics, science, and engineering with art and communication.  He was positive on the future of technology stating

Key publications 
Ted Davis has authored numerous journal articles describing significant advances in statistical mechanics, transport, fluid mechanics, and interfacial phenomena which includes but is not limited to:

H. Ted Davis, Stuart A. Rice, Lothar Meyer "On the Kinetic Theory of Simple Dense Fluids. XI. Experimental and Theoretical Studies of Positive Ion Mobility in Liquid Ar, Kr, and Xe", Journal of Chemical Physics, 37, 947, (1962).
Lloyd R. White, H. Ted Davis "Thermal Conductivity of Molten Alkali Nitrates", Journal of Chemical Physics, 47, 5433, (1967).
V. Bongiorno, H. Ted Davis "Modified van der Waals theory of fluid interfaces", Physical Review A, 12, 2213, (1975).
H. Ted Davis "Capillary waves and the mean field theory of interfaces", Journal of Chemical Physics, 67, 3636, (1977).
Muhammad Sahimi, Barry D. Hughes, L.E. Scriven, H. Ted Davis "Real-space renormalization and effective-medium approximation to the percolation conduction problem", Physical Review B, 28, 307, (1983).
Susan A. Somers, H. Ted Davis "Microscopic dynamics of fluids confined between smooth and atomically structured solid surfaces", Journal of Chemical Physics, 96, 5389, (1992).
V. Gupta, S.S. Nivarthi, A.V. McCormick, H. Ted Davis "Evidence for single file diffusion of ethane in the molecular sieve AlPO4-5", Chemical Physics Letters, 247(4-6), 596-600, (1995).
Robert S. Maier, Daniel M. Kroll, Robert S. Bernard, Stacy E. Howington, John F. Peters, and H. Ted Davis "Hydrodynamic dispersion in confined packed beds", Physics of Fluids, 15, 3795, (2003).

Ted was also the author of two highly influential books:

H. Ted Davis, Kendall T. Thomson"Linear Algebra and Linear Operators in Engineering: with Applications in Mathematica", 1st Edition 2000, Academic press.  
H. Ted Davis "Statistical Mechanics of Phases, Interfaces and Thin Films", 1st Edition 1996, Wiley-VCH

References

External links 
 A Heritage of Excellence: the History of CEMS, UMN
 Minnesota Chemical Engineering and Materials Science
 Academic Tree - Ted Davis

1937 births
2009 deaths
Members of the United States National Academy of Engineering
American chemical engineers
American materials scientists
20th-century American educators
University of Minnesota faculty
Minnesota CEMS
20th-century American engineers
University of Chicago alumni
Furman University alumni